The AWF Tag Team Championship is a professional wrestling championship currently inactive in the South African professional wrestling promotion Africa Wrestling Alliance, contested among tag teams. It was created on 11 December 2004. The Saint and The Gladiator were the first and last champions, having defeated The Missing Link and Trashman to win the belts on the 2-hour live special, AWF on E Slam Series Final. The titles were soon retired in early 2005 after AWA failed to secure another year of television with eTV.

Title history

See also
Africa Wrestling Alliance

References

External links
Official African Wrestling Alliance Website

Africa Wrestling Alliance championships
Tag team wrestling championships